George Milne Langlands (1886–1951) was a Scottish footballer who played as an inside left for Dundee and Forfar Athletic. He was a member of the Dundee team that won the Scottish Cup in 1910 (in the first of three matches in the final, he scored the last-minute equaliser which forced a replay), having been runners-up in the Scottish Football League the previous season. In a career interrupted by World War I, he returned to hometown club Forfar Athletic (where he had also started out) after the conflict and was an important member of the team during the years when they moved up from the Scottish Football Alliance to become an SFL club.

References

1886 births
1951 deaths
Association football inside forwards
Dundee F.C. players
Forfar Athletic F.C. players
Scottish Football League players
Scottish footballers
People from Forfar
Footballers from Angus, Scotland